City University College is a tertiary institution in Addis Ababa, Ethiopia. It provides higher education in the disciplines of Accounting and Finance, Applied Computer Science, Management, Economics and Law.

External links
 City University College website

Universities and colleges in Ethiopia
2000 establishments in Ethiopia
Educational institutions established in 2000
Education in Addis Ababa